Bridge in Radnor Township No. 2 is a historic brick and concrete arch bridge located at Villanova in Delaware County, Pennsylvania. It features an ornate parapet cap. It spans the Meadowbrook Run.

It was listed on the National Register of Historic Places in 1988.

References 

Road bridges on the National Register of Historic Places in Pennsylvania
Bridges completed in 1905
Bridges in Delaware County, Pennsylvania
National Register of Historic Places in Delaware County, Pennsylvania
Arch bridges in the United States
Concrete bridges in the United States
Brick bridges in the United States
1905 establishments in Pennsylvania